All Saints’ Church, South Leverton is a Grade II* listed parish church in the Church of England in South Leverton, Nottinghamshire.

History
The church dates from the 12th century. The chancel was restored by Ewan Christian in 1868; the remainder restored by C. Scholefield in 1897.

It is in a joint parish with 
St. Nicholas' Church, Askham
All Saints' Church, Babworth
St Martin's Church, Bole
Our Lady and St Peter's Church, Bothamsall
St John the Baptist Church, Clarborough
All Saints' Church, Eaton
St Giles' Church, Elkesley
St Peter's Church, Gamston
St. Helen's Church, Grove
St Peter's Church, Hayton
St Martin's Church, North Leverton
St Peter and St Paul's Church, North Wheatley
All Hallows' Church, Ordsall
St Martin's Church, Ranby
St Saviour's Church Retford
St Swithun's Church, East Retford
St Michael the Archangel's Church, Retford
St Peter and St Paul's Church, Sturton-le-Steeple
St Bartholomew's Church, Sutton-cum-Lound
St Paul's Church, West Drayton

References

12th-century church buildings in England
Church of England church buildings in Nottinghamshire
Grade II* listed churches in Nottinghamshire